The San Ramon Valley Unified School District (SRVUSD) is a public school district in Contra Costa County, California. It has 36 school sites serving more than 32,000 students within the communities of Alamo, Danville, Blackhawk, Diablo, and San Ramon (including Dougherty Valley). It was founded in 1964.

Boundary
The district includes: Blackhawk, Camino Tassajara, Danville, Diablo, Norris Canyon, and San Ramon. It also includes the majority of Alamo and a small portion of Walnut Creek.

Schools

High schools
 California High School (San Ramon)
 Dougherty Valley High School (San Ramon)
 Monte Vista High School (Danville/Alamo)
 San Ramon Valley High School (Danville)

Middle schools
 Charlotte Wood Middle School
 Diablo Vista Middle School
 Gale Ranch Middle School
 Iron Horse Middle School
 Los Cerros Middle School
 Pine Valley Middle School
 Stone Valley Middle School
 Windemere Ranch Middle School

Elementary schools
 Alamo Elementary School
 Bella Vista Elementary School
 Bollinger Elementary School
 Country Club Elementary School
 Coyote Creek Elementary School
 Creekside Elementary School
 Golden View Elementary School
 Green Valley Elementary School
 Greenbrook Elementary School
 Hidden Hills Elementary School
 John Baldwin Elementary School
 Live Oak Elementary School
 Montair Elementary School
 Montevideo Elementary School
 Neil Armstrong Elementary School
 Quail Run Elementary School
 Rancho Romero Elementary School
 Sycamore Valley Elementary School
 Tassajara Hills Elementary School
 Twin Creeks Elementary School
 Vista Grande Elementary School
 Walt Disney Elementary School

Alternative schools
 Del Amigo Continuation High School
 Venture Independent Study School

Awards
SRVUSD has been named to the annual AP District Honor Roll for eight consecutive years, one of only two school districts to achieve this milestone.

References

External links
 

School districts in Contra Costa County, California
1964 establishments in California
School districts established in 1964